Christchurch City may refer to:

 Christchurch City (district), the area covered by Christchurch City Council, the local government authority for Christchurch
 The city of Christchurch, New Zealand
 Christchurch United, a former association football team from Christchurch, New Zealand

See also 
 Christchurch (disambiguation)